Mocomoco or Muqu Muqu (Aymara) is a location in the La Paz Department in Bolivia. It is the seat of the Mocomoco Municipality in the Eliodoro Camacho Province.

References 

 Instituto Nacional de Estadistica de Bolivia

External links 
 Mocomoco Municipality: population data and map 

Populated places in La Paz Department (Bolivia)